Wood River is a city in Madison County, Illinois. The population was 10,464 as of the 2020 census.

Geography
Wood River is located in western Madison County at  (38.863047, -90.088527). The current confluence of the Mississippi and the Missouri rivers is just south of one of these neighboring villages, Hartford. Wood River is bordered to the northwest by East Alton, to the north by Rosewood Heights, to the northeast by Bethalto, to the southeast by Roxana, to the south by Hartford, and to the southwest, across the Mississippi River, by West Alton, Missouri.

Illinois Route 3 passes through the west side of the city, leading north  to the north side of Alton and south  to East St. Louis. Illinois Route 143 passes through the center of Wood River as Madison Avenue, leading northwest  to the center of Alton and southeast  to Edwardsville. Illinois Route 111 follows Central Avenue through the center of Wood River, leading north  to the west part of Bethalto and south  to Washington Park. Illinois Route 255, a four-lane limited-access highway, passes through the east side of Wood River, leading northwest  to Godfrey and south  to Collinsville.

Demographics

At the 2000 census there were 11,296 people, 4,725 households, and 2,995 families living in the city. The racial makeup of the city was 97.57% White, 0.63% African American, 0.27% Native American, 0.45% Asian, 0.35% from other races, and 0.73% from two or more races. Hispanic or Latino of any race were 1.21%.

Of the 4,725 households 29.9% had children under the age of 18 living with them, 46.2% were married couples living together, 13.0% had a female householder with no husband present, and 36.6% were non-families. 31.7% of households were one person and 14.7% were one person aged 65 or older. The average household size was 2.36 and the average family size was 2.96.

The age distribution was 24.1% under the age of 18, 10.2% from 18 to 24, 28.7% from 25 to 44, 20.1% from 45 to 64, and 16.9% 65 or older. The median age was 36 years. For every 100 females, there were 90.3 males. For every 100 females age 18 and over, there were 86.6 males.

The median household income was $33,875 and the median family income was $41,688. Males had a median income of $35,097 versus $24,522 for females. The per capita income for the city was $18,098. About 13.2% of families and 14.8% of the population were below the poverty line, including 21.2% of those under age 18 and 10.6% of those age 65 or over.

Transportation
Amtrak's Texas Eagle as well as its Lincoln Service pass through Wood River but do not stop in the small city. The nearest station is Alton station,  to the northwest.

Notable people 

 Joe Astroth, professional baseball player; attended Wood River High School
 Roger Counsil, NCAA champion gymnastics coach
 Gary Lane, Missouri University and NFL quarterback, NFL official
 Ken Retzer, professional baseball player; born in Wood River
 Dewayne Staats, broadcaster for the Tampa Bay Rays; raised in Wood River
 John Stoneham, professional baseball player
 Jean Stothert, mayor of Omaha, Nebraska
 Kristopher Tharp, member of the Illinois Senate

References

External links
 

Cities in Madison County, Illinois
Populated places established in 1908
Illinois populated places on the Mississippi River
1908 establishments in Illinois
Cities in Illinois